Ashok Kumar Mathur (born 7 August 1943) the former Chief justice of Calcutta High Court and Chief justice of Madhya Pradesh High Court, Justice of the Supreme Court of India. He was appointed the Chairman of Armed Forces Tribunal, also he was appointed Chairman of  7th Central Pay Commission. He also conducted a court of inquiry in Boeing crash at Ahmedabad in 1987–88.

Early life
Ashok Mathur completed his M.A. degree in Philosophy from Rajasthan University in 1964 and passed his LL.B. in 1966.

Career
Ashok Mathur started his lawyer career in the Rajasthan High Court in 1967. Initially he worked as Government Advocate. He was elevated as a Judge on 13 July 1985 of the Rajasthan High Court. He also conducted a court of inquiry in Boeing crash at Ahmedabad in 1987–88. He was transferred from Rajasthan High Court to Madhya Pradesh High Court in February 1994 and was elevated as the Chief Justice of Madhya Pradesh High Court. Then he was transferred to Calcutta High Court as Chief Justice on 22 December 1999. Ashok Mathur became a judge of the Supreme Court in 2004 and retired from service on 7 August 2008 from there. After the retirement, he was appointed the Chairman of the Armed Forces Tribunal and also headed the 7th Central Pay Commission (CPC).

References

1943 births
Living people
20th-century Indian judges
Chief Justices of the Calcutta High Court
Judges of the Madhya Pradesh High Court
Judges of the Rajasthan High Court
Justices of the Supreme Court of India
20th-century Indian lawyers
21st-century Indian judges
University of Rajasthan alumni